Buskirk Bluffs is a sheer rock bluff on the west side of McMahon Glacier in the Anare Mountains, a major mountain range situated in Victoria Land, Antarctica. The geographical feature was so named by the Australian National Antarctic Research Expeditions (ANARE) for Major H. Buskirk, United States Air Force, official American observer with ANARE (Thala Dan), 1962, which explored this area. The bluff lies situated on the Pennell Coast, a portion of Antarctica lying between Cape Williams, and Cape Adare.

References
 

Cliffs of Victoria Land
Pennell Coast